Wyrąb  is a village in the administrative district of Gmina Sokołów Podlaski, within Sokołów County, Masovian Voivodeship, in east-central Poland. From 1975–1998, it was part of the Siedlce Voivodeship.

References

Villages in Sokołów County